Cuba-Iran relations, which are characterized by economic and diplomatic cooperation, are quite friendly. Iran has a productive trade balance with Cuba. The two governments signed a document to bolster cooperation in Havana in January 2006. President Mahmoud Ahmadinejad called relations "firm and progressive" over the past three decades.

Background

According to the Christian Science Monitor, relations had been growing "has been under way for some years prior to Ahmadinejad's ascendancy to the presidency." Observers of Cuba point to the fact Iran used an electronic jamming station outside Havana which Cuba blocks broadcasting by the US-backed Radio Marti. Iran also worked with Cuba expertise to jam American broadcasting into its borders. Cuba has also helped build a genetic laboratory in Iran.

Trade
According to the above-mentioned January 2006 document, Iran and Cuba expanded cooperation in several commercial, banking, agriculture, health and cultural fields. The two countries also stated they will expand cooperation in areas of the sugar industry, fishery, biotechnology, sports, transportation, development projects, investment, tourism, information technology and communications and water resources.

The document asks for Iran and Cuba to provide more facilities in banking cooperation with an aim of promoting economic and trade ties and making use of mutual scientific, research and industrial capabilities. In 2006 trading between the two countries reached US$5 million.

In 2008, Iran granted Cuba a 200-million-Euro credit line to undertake several different projects; a large part of that money was dedicated to financing Cuban imports of railroad wagons, both for cargo and passengers.

Nuclear energy
Cuba supports Iran's program to develop nuclear technology for peaceful purposes though the countries agreed to stop the proliferation of nuclear weapons. Former President of Cuba Fidel Castro spoke admiringly of Iran "increasing its ability to fight big powers by the day."

See also 
 Foreign relations of Cuba 
 Foreign relations of Iran

References

 
Iran
Bilateral relations of Iran